Crescent City (Tolowa: Taa-’at-dvn; Yurok: Kohpey; Wiyot: Daluwagh) is the only incorporated city in Del Norte County, California; it is also the county seat. Named for the crescent-shaped stretch of sandy beach south of the city, Crescent City had a total population of 6,673 in the 2020 census, down from 7,643 in the 2010 census. The population includes inmates at Pelican Bay State Prison, also within the city limits, and the former census-designated place Crescent City North annexed to the city. The city is also the site of the Redwood National Park headquarters, as well as the historic Battery Point Light. Due to the richness of the local Pacific Ocean waters and the related catch, and ease of access, Crescent City Harbor serves as home port for numerous commercial fishing vessels.

Crescent City's offshore geography makes it unusually susceptible to tsunamis. Much of the city was destroyed by four tsunami waves generated by the Great Alaskan earthquake off Anchorage, Alaska in 1964. More recently, the city's harbor suffered extensive damage and destruction from tsunamis generated by the March 11, 2011 earthquake off Sendai, Japan. Several dozen vessels and many of the docks they were moored to were destroyed as wave cycles related to the tsunamis exceeded .

The climate of Crescent City is moderate, with cool summers for its latitude as a result of intense maritime moderation. Nearby inland areas behind the mountains have significantly warmer summer temperatures.

History
The area that is now known as Del Norte County was and still is inhabited by the Yurok (Klamath River Indians) and Tolowa Nations of indigenous peoples. The first European American to explore this land was pioneer Jedediah Smith in the early 19th century. He was the first European American to reach the area overland on foot in a time before the European Americans knew anything about such a distant territory. For him it was literally "Land's End" — where the American continent ended at the Pacific Ocean. In 1855, the U.S. Congress authorized the building of a lighthouse at "the battery point" (a high tide island on the coast of Crescent City) which is still functioning as a historical landmark.

European explorers first visited the area by ship in the late 1820s. Europeans began moving to the area in the 1850s. Crescent City was incorporated as a city in 1854.

Historic ships
 Crescent City was a  schooner built in 1848 by Joshua T. Foster of Medford, Massachusetts.
The Brother Jonathan, a paddle steamer, crashed on an uncharted rock near Point St. George, off the coast of Crescent City, California, on July 30, 1865.
 A 1906 ship named Crescent City was the former Jim Butler, a  steam schooner built by Lindstrom Shipbuilding Company in Aberdeen, Washington, that wrecked in the Channel Islands, off Santa Cruz Island, in 1927.
 The SS Emidio, a  tanker of the General Petroleum Corporation (later Mobil Oil), was the first casualty of the Imperial Japanese Navy's submarine force action on California's Pacific Coast on December 20, 1941. The damaged tanker broke up on the rocks off Crescent City. The remaining pieces of the ship are now California Historical Landmark #497.

Geography
Fishing and crabbing, tourism, and timber are the major sources of income in  Del Norte County. Elk Creek flows into the Pacific Ocean at Crescent City. Crescent City is as far north in latitude as Chicago, Middle Island in Ontario, Canada, as well as New England on the Atlantic side. It is as much as nine degrees latitude north of San Diego at the southern tip of the state. Crescent City is closer to Vancouver, Canada than to Los Angeles.

Climate
Crescent City has a warm-summer Mediterranean climate (Köppen Csb), with moderation similar to an oceanic climate (Cfb). On average, four mornings each winter fall below .

Cold winter days are also rare. Between 1991 and 2020, the coldest maximum temperature averaged .

Tsunamis

The topography of the sea floor surrounding Crescent City has the effect of focusing tsunamis. According to researchers at Humboldt State University and the University of Southern California, the city experienced tsunami conditions 31 times between the years 1933 and 2008. Although many of these incidents were barely perceptible, eleven events included wave measurements exceeding one meter, four events caused damage, and one event in particular is commonly cited as "the largest and most destructive recorded tsunami to strike the United States Pacific Coast."

On March 27, 1964, the Great Alaskan earthquake off Anchorage, Alaska, set in motion local landslide tsunamis, as well as a trans-Pacific wave. The tsunami wave travel time to Crescent City was 4.1 hours after the earthquake, but it only produced localized flooding. The second and third waves to hit Crescent City were smaller, but the fourth wave struck with a height of approximately  after having drawn the harbor out nearly dry. The next morning the damage was counted: 289 buildings and businesses had been destroyed; 1,000 cars and 25 large fishing vessels had been crushed; 12 people were confirmed dead, over 100 were injured, and more were missing; and 60 blocks had been inundated, with 30 city blocks destroyed. Although most of the missing were later accounted for, not all were tracked down. Insurance adjusters estimated that the city received more damage from the tsunami on a block-by-block basis than did Anchorage from the initial earthquake.

The tsunami raced down the West Coast with more deaths and destruction, but no other location was hit as hard. Crescent City bore the brunt, due to its offshore geography, position relative to the earthquake's strike-line, underwater contours such as the Cobb Seamount, and the position of rivers near the city. Although houses, buildings, and infrastructure were later rebuilt, years passed before the city recovered from the devastation to lives, property, and its economy. Since the 1980s, the breakwater has been protected from normal storm waves by hundreds of Dolos armor units, 38 ton concrete shapes.

The city is deemed to be tsunami-ready today.

On November 15, 2006, a magnitude 8.3 earthquake struck off Simushir Island in the Kuril Islands in the western Pacific. A tsunami warning was issued but rescinded hours later. However, a surge from that quake did hit the harbor at Crescent City causing damage to three docks and several boats. Governor Arnold Schwarzenegger declared a county state of emergency. Upon that declaration, the area affected was eligible for federal emergency relief funding to repair the damage.

Parts of the city were evacuated on March 11, 2011, after a 9.0 earthquake struck Japan. Thirty-five boats were destroyed, and the harbor suffered major damage. Five were swept out to sea, and one person was killed.

Demographics

2003
As of the 2003 Population Estimate from the Census Bureau, there were 7,319 people living in the city. Census data from the year 2000 indicate that the population density was 2,252.2/sqmi (868.9/km2). There were 1,754 housing units at an average density of 986.1/sqmi (380.5/km2). The racial makeup of the city was 78.3% White, 0.5% Black or African American, 6.1% Native American, 4.6% Asian, 0.1% Pacific Islander, 4.3% from other races, and 6.0% from two or more races. 11.0% of the population were Hispanic or Latino of any race.

There were 1,578 households, out of which 35.6% had children under the age of 18 living with them, 33.4% were married couples living together, 20.5% had a female householder with no husband present, and 41.7% were non-families. 35.8% of all households were made up of individuals, and 13.6% had someone living alone who was 65 years of age or older. The average household size was 2.40 and the average family size was 3.12.

The city population contained 30.1% under the age of 18, 11.1% from 18 to 24, 26.7% from 25 to 44, 18.2% from 45 to 64, and 13.9% who were 65 years of age or older. The median age was 32 years. For every 100 females, there were 85.9 males. For every 100 females age 18 and over, there were 82.4 males.

The median income for a household in the city was $20,133, and the median income for a family was $22,058. Males had a median income of $36,667 versus $19,922 for females. The per capita income for the city was $12,833. 34.6% of the population and 33.7% of families were below the poverty line. Out of the total population, 46.6% of those under the age of 18 and 4.8% of those 65 and older were living below the poverty line.

2010
The 2010 United States Census reported that Crescent City had a population of 7,643. The population density was 3,164.9/sqmi (1,222.0/km2). The racial makeup of Crescent City was 5,052 (66.1%) White, 910 (11.9%) African American, 370 (4.8%) Native American, 333 (4.4%) Asian, 7 (0.1%) Pacific Islander, 696 (9.1%) from other races, and 275 (3.6%) from two or more races. Hispanic or Latino of any race were 2,342 persons (30.6%).

The Census reported that 4,063 people (53.2% of the population) lived in households, 28 (0.4%) lived in non-institutionalized group quarters, and 3,552 (46.5%) were institutionalized. The very high institutionalized percentage is a result of the presence of Pelican Bay State Prison, which was annexed into the city limits in the 1990s.

There were 1,707 households, out of which 559 (32.7%) had children under the age of 18 living in them, 512 (30.0%) were opposite-sex married couples living together, 314 (18.4%) had a female householder with no husband present, 114 (6.7%) had a male householder with no wife present. There were 170 (10.0%) unmarried opposite-sex partnerships, and 7 (0.4%) same-sex married couples or partnerships. 614 households (36.0%) were made up of individuals, and 229 (13.4%) had someone living alone who was 65 years of age or older. The average household size was 2.38. There were 940 families (55.1% of all households); the average family size was 3.13.

The city population contained 1,107 people (14.5%) under the age of 18, 934 people (12.2%) aged 18 to 24, 3,292 people (43.1%) aged 25 to 44, 1,725 people (22.6%) aged 45 to 64, and 585 people (7.7%) who were 65 years of age or older. The median age was 34.9 years. For every 100 females, there were 250.1 males. For every 100 females age 18 and over, there were 298.5 males.

There were 1,906 housing units at an average density of 789.2/sqmi (304.7/km2), of which 1,707 were occupied, of which 532 (31.2%) were owner-occupied, and 1,175 (68.8%) were occupied by renters. The homeowner vacancy rate was 7.7%; the rental vacancy rate was 4.8%. 1,203 people (15.7% of the population) lived in owner-occupied housing units and 2,860 people (37.4%) lived in rental housing units.

Government

Education
The public schools of Crescent City are part of the Del Norte County Unified School District, which encompasses all of the public schools in Del Norte County. The following are schools within Crescent City or its immediate vicinity.
 Del Norte High School is the only public high school in Crescent City, located on the northern edge of town. It replaced the earlier high school that was more centrally located, and which remains today as a public-access gymnasium and county offices.
 The Bess Maxwell Elementary School is the older of two elementary schools in the northern part of town that are located near the high school. Bess Maxwell serves grades 1–5. In its earlier years, it was a K–6 school.
 The Castle Rock Charter School is a K–12 charter school that provides personalized education to students, and is the liaison school for parents who home school their children. It operates the Tah-Ah-Dun American Indian Magnet School to provide for the unique requirements of American Indian students who might be at risk. (Tah-Ah-Dun is the Tolowa name for Crescent City, honoring the Tolowa village that stood on present-day Crescent City.) The school is accredited by the Western Association of Schools and Colleges.
 Crescent Elk Middle School is the oldest operating school site in town, centrally located in Crescent City. The site was originally a K–8 school, but slowly shed grade levels to other schools as it became a 4–6 school with a separate 7–8 program, then the 6–8 program that it is today.
 Mary Peacock Elementary School is the newer of two elementary schools that are located near the high school. The creation of Pelican Bay State Prison caused an increase in housing demand in the Crescent City area, and an increased school district population. This school was built to address that demand, but is not directly associated with the prison.
 Joe Hamilton Elementary School is a K–5 school located near Crescent Elk Middle School. It was founded as a K–3 school.
 Pine Grove Elementary School has been a K–5 school for many years. It serves the eastern part of Crescent City.
 Sunset High School is another Crescent City high school with its own child care center.

Transportation
Highway access is provided by U.S. Route 101, which runs directly through the city, connecting the Oregon Coast to the north and Eureka to the south. U.S. Route 199 begins north of Crescent City and runs northeast to Grants Pass, Oregon. The junction of U.S. Routes 101 and 199 is one of only two junctions of two U.S. Routes in California, the other being the junction of U.S. Routes 6 and 395 in Bishop.

SkyWest Airlines formerly served Del Norte County Airport (also known as Jack McNamara Field) as United Express until April 7, 2015. Most flights connected to San Francisco International Airport. PenAir contracted to begin serving the airport with Saab 340 turboprop aircraft beginning September 15, 2015.
Contour Airlines currently operates flights from Crescent City (CEC) to the Oakland International Airport (OAK).

Local public transit is provided by Redwood Coast Transit and by various taxi companies. Crescent City is also served by Curry Public Transit, and POINT.

The Crescent City Harbor serves as a commercial fishing port for salmon, shrimp, tuna, cod, and dungeness crab commercial fishing vessels. The Harbor is also home to multiple fishing and non-fishing related businesses and harbor governmental offices. The Crescent City Harbor also has several pleasure boat docks.

Arts and culture

Attractions

 In town
 Battery Point Lighthouse
 Crescent City Harbor
 Del Norte County Historical Society Main Museum
 SS Emidio Memorial
 Nearby
 Del Norte Coast Redwoods State Park
 Jedediah Smith Redwoods State Park
 Lost Monarch (tree)—Largest known Coastal Redwood by volume.
 Pelican Bay State Prison
 Redwood National and State Parks
 St. George Reef Lighthouse
 Smith River National Recreation Area
 Tolowa Dunes State Park
 Trees of Mystery

Annual events
Fourth of July fireworks display – July
Sea Cruise Car Show Weekend – Columbus Day Weekend – October

Notable people

Eunice Bommelyn – tribal historian and the last person to speak Tolowa as a native first language
Loren Bommelyn – tradition bearer for the Tolowa tribe
Donald H. Clausen – American politician
James F. Curtis – commander of Camp Lincoln
Louis DeMartin – Del Norte County pioneer
David Owen Dryden – builder-architect in the craftsman style
Cody Hoffman – football wide receiver, and multi-record holder, for the football team of Brigham Young University
Derrick Jensen – author and environmentalist
Rick Keene - California politician
Lee Kohse - artist
Clinton McKinnon - musician (Mr. Bungle)
Justin Miller – lawyer and a federal appellate judge
Buck Pierce – professional football player, Canadian Football League
Jacksen Pierce – author
Fred Rinne – visual and performance artist
Max Steineke – petroleum geologist
Audrey Wagner – outfielder in the All-American Girls Professional Baseball League
Wendell Wood – conservationist and environmentalist

International relations

Twin towns – sister cities

Crescent City is twinned with:
  Rikuzentakata, Japan (January 7, 2019)

See also

 Achulet Massacre
 Fort Dick, California
 Lake Earl
 Yontoket Massacre

References

External links

 
 Visit Crescent City Visitor Information
 The Story of Kamome

 
Cities in Del Norte County, California
County seats in California
Incorporated cities and towns in California
Populated coastal places in California
Ports and harbors of California
Redwood National and State Parks
Settlements formerly in Klamath County, California
1854 establishments in California
Populated places established in 1854